Alcobaça is a Portuguese wine region centered on the town of Alcobaça in the Estremadura region. The region was initially an Indicação de Proveniencia Regulamentada (IPR) region, but in 2005 it became one of two subregions of the Encostas d'Aire DOC, which has Denominação de Origem Controlada (DOC) status. Its name may still be indicated together with that of Encostas d'Aire, as Encostas d'Aire-Alcobaça.

The region produces predominantly white wines with lower alcohol levels then it neighboring wine regions on in Estremadura.

Grapes
The principal grapes of the Alcobaça region include Arinto, Baga, Fernao Pires, Malvasia, Periquita, Tamarez, Trincadeira and Vital.

See also
List of Portuguese wine regions

References

Wine regions of Portugal